Hans Kissel (19 February 1897 – 30 November 1975) was a highly decorated Generalmajor in the Wehrmacht during World War II. He was also a recipient of the Knight's Cross of the Iron Cross. The Knight's Cross of the Iron Cross was awarded to recognise extreme battlefield bravery or successful military leadership.

Awards and decorations
 Iron Cross (1914)
 2nd Class
 1st Class
 Honour Cross of the World War 1914/1918
 Iron Cross (1939)
 2nd Class
 1st Class
 Wound Badge (1939)
 in Black or Silver
 Eastern Front Medal
 German Cross in Gold (18 June 1942)
 Knight's Cross of the Iron Cross on 17 March 1944 as Oberst and commander of Grenadier-Regiment 683

References

Citations

Bibliography

External links

TracesOfWar.com
Lexikon der Wehrmacht

1897 births
1975 deaths
Military personnel from Mannheim
Major generals of the German Army (Wehrmacht)
German Army personnel of World War I
Recipients of the clasp to the Iron Cross, 1st class
Recipients of the Gold German Cross
Recipients of the Knight's Cross of the Iron Cross
German prisoners of war in World War II
People from the Grand Duchy of Baden
Volkssturm personnel
German Army generals of World War II